Christopher Hodgson may refer to:
Chris Hodgson (born 1962), Canadian politician
Christopher Hodgson (priest) (1561– after 1596), Catholic priest who played a minor role in the Babington Plot 
Christopher Pemberton Hodgson (1821–1865), English colonial pastoralist, traveller and writer